Francesc Berenguer i Mestres (21 July 1866 – 8 February 1914) was a Spanish Modernista architect from Catalonia, and an assistant and friend of Antoni Gaudí.

He was born in Reus. He worked with several architectural workshops. First, he worked for August Font i Carreras, former teacher at the School, and later was with Miguel Pascual i Tintorer, municipal architect of Gràcia and Josep Graner i Prat. He died in Barcelona.

References 

1866 births
1914 deaths
Art Nouveau architects
Architects from Catalonia
Modernisme architects